Heptaulacus is a genus of scarab beetles in the family Scarabaeidae. There are about eight described species in Heptaulacus, found in the Palearctic. Some of these species have been transferred from the genus Aphodius.

Species
These eight species belong to the genus Heptaulacus:
 Heptaulacus algarbiensis Branco & Baraud, 1984
 Heptaulacus brancoi Baraud, 1976
 Heptaulacus gadetinus Baraud, 1973
 Heptaulacus koshantschikoffi Schmidt, 1911
 Heptaulacus pirazzolii (Fairmaire, 1881)
 Heptaulacus rasettii Carpaneto, 1978
 Heptaulacus syrticola (Fairmaire, 1882)
 Heptaulacus testudinarius (Fabricius, 1775)

References

Scarabaeidae
Scarabaeidae genera
Taxa named by Étienne Mulsant